Linhó is an affluent village in the municipality of Sintra, on the Portuguese Riviera, known for its resorts, restaurants, and its two prominent gated communities, Quinta da Penha Longa and Quinta da Beloura. Linhó is home to a large expatriate community, the only American school in Portugal (Carlucci American International School of Lisbon), and has hosted a Bilderberg Meeting.

Linhó is known for its gourmet culinary scene, including, artisanal food shops, fine dining, and events like Christmas markets and its annual Artisanal Beer Festival.

History

The Igreja da Penha Longa and its Hieronymite convent date originally to the 14th century, but the church's current interior dates from the reign of Cardinal-King Henry I of Portugal, in the 16th century.

On 12 April 1903, the Grupo União Recreativa do Linhó (Linhó Recreational Union), a society for local civic life, is founded.

Famed South African poet Roy Campbell lived in Linhó in the 1950s, from 1956 until his death.

Marcelo Caetano, 101st Prime Minister of Portugal, had his summer home in Linhó. Beginning in 1958, Caetano, then an ousted politician and Rector of the University of Lisbon, began using his Linhó home to host meetings and plan his assent to become Prime Minister, which he became in 1968. A street in Linhó is named after him.

In 1998, Hillary Clinton, then First Lady of the United States, inaugurated the newly built campus of the American International School of Lisbon in Linhó.

The 1999 Bilderberg Meeting was hosted at the Ritz-Carlton Penha Longa Resort in Quinta da Penha Longa.

Communities
Linhó is home to two prominent gated communities of the Portuguese Riviera:
Quinta da Penha Longa
Quinta da Beloura

Tourism

Linhó is near to numerous UNESCO World Heritage Sites, such as Pena National Palace, Queluz National Palace, and the Historic Centre of Sintra, as well as numerous landmarks and sites within the larger Portuguese Riviera. Linhó is a prominent gastronomy, spa, and resort destination.

Gastronomy
Linhó is home to two Michelin Guide-starred restaurants: 
LAB by Sergi Arola
Midori

Resorts
Pestana Golf Resort - Quinta da Beloura
Ritz-Carlton Resort - Quinta da Penha Longa

Golf
Quinta da Beloura's golf courses were designed by American golf architect Rocky Roquemore, and Quinta da Penha Longa's courses were designed by Robert Trent Jones Jr.

Penha Longa has hosted the Open de Portugal three times, the Estoril Challenge de Portugal twice, and the Estoril Open once.

Beloura holds the Portuguese Golf Federation's annual National Senior's Championship.

Tennis
Linhó's Beloura Tennis Academy (BTA) has hosted the Portuguese Tennis Federation's prestigious Campeonato Nacional Absoluto (National Absolute Championship) in 2017. BTA is known for hosting the annual Beloura Junior Open, a European qualifying tournament.

Since 2017, Beloura annually hosts the BTA Futures, part of the International Tennis Federation's Men's Circuit.

Equestrian
Linhó's Quinta da Beloura Equestrian Center (Portuguese: Centro Hípico Quinta da Beloura) holds numerous equestrian events including the Portuguese Equestrian Federation's 2015 Taça de Portugal (Portuguese Cup Championship). The Beloura team won this event in 2004.

Beloura hosted the 2017 Portuguese National Horseball Championship, as well as the 2017 and 2018 Troféu de Dressage em Póneis (English: Pony Dressage Trophy), an annual dressage competition held between equestrian academies of the Portuguese Riviera.

Education

The Carlucci American International School of Lisbon is the oldest American school in the Iberian Peninsula and the only U.S. State Department-sanctioned school in Portugal.

In 2020, TASIS Schools, a highly ranked private Swiss group of international boarding schools, established TASIS Portugal in Linhó.

Linhó Detention Center
Just outside of Linhó, Sintra, and sharing its name, in the neighboring civil parish of Alcabideche, in Cascais Municipality, there is a major penitentiary of Lisbon Metropolitan Area. With 90 ha, part of the large detention complex is within Linhó, Sintra. It was founded in a conterminous area in 1954 as Cadeia Central de Lisboa (Lisbon Central Jail) and is now called Estabelecimento Prisional de Linhó (Linhó Detention Center).

Notable people
Cristiano Ronaldo, Portuguese footballer
Bryan Adams - Grammy Award-winning Canadian musician 
Marcelo Caetano, 101st Prime Minister of Portugal
José Sócrates, 117th Prime Minister of Portugal
Dânia Neto, Portuguese model and actress
Roy Campbell, famed South African poet
Artur Pizarro - Portuguese concert pianist 
Suzanne Anton - Canadian politician, former Attorney General of British Columbia
Pedro Pinto - Chief of Press for UEFA, former CNN International anchor 
Shahal M. Khan, American owner of the Plaza Hotel in New York City

See also

Sintra
Portuguese Riviera

References

Places in Sintra
Villages in Portugal